Fatal Labyrinth, titled  in Japan, is a role-playing video game developed and published by Sega. Originally available exclusively on the Sega Meganet multiplayer gaming service in 1990, it was later remade for the Sega Genesis in 1991. The game appears in Sonic's Ultimate Genesis Collection for Xbox 360 and PlayStation 3, and was later included in Sega Genesis Classics for PlayStation 4, Xbox One, and Nintendo Switch. The game was also released for Microsoft Windows on September 13, 2010. The game is similar to and shares assets with Dragon Crystal, which was also released around that time.

Gameplay

The player controls a nondescript hero who has agreed to enter a forbidden labyrinth, battle various monsters, and make way up to the 30th floor where an evil dragon guards a stolen Holy Goblet. The hero may walk about town talking with the villagers for advice prior to entering the labyrinth. Upon defeating the dragon and reclaiming the Goblet, the player flies back to the village to speak to villagers, who offer praises and congratulations for the hero's efforts.

Although Fatal Labyrinth does have a very basic experience points system, it is not exactly a typical turn-based or action RPG. It shares elements with roguelike games, with a much simpler storyline and gameplay. Just as in roguelike games, each level and its contents are randomly generated, similarly to Chunsoft's Mystery Dungeon series.

On each level of the labyrinth, weapons, armor, magic rings, and other items are found, which can be equipped or thrown. Melee weapons include axes, swords and polearms (although the length of the weapon determines its characteristics). Short weapons (axes, short swords) are more powerful but less accurate while longer weapons (broad swords, polearms) usually hit for less damage but are more accurate. Bows and shurikens are included for projectile combat. Body armor, helmets and shields can be found. The effects in magic rings vary from powering up the hero to using them as magical throwing projectiles.

Fatal Labyrinth also has a wide variety of other items, including scrolls, canes and potions. A key part of the game revolves around identifying which of these items benefit the character and which ones have curses. Sometimes throwing these items can cause projectile damage. After defeating monsters, the hero levels up and gains health points, added attack power and receives a better title.

Enemies only move and attack in response to the player's actions; i.e., when the player takes a step, the enemies take a step. Checkpoints exist on every fifth floor; upon dying, the player is returned to those floors if they were reached. If the hero wanders around a level for too long, the screen will flash and the monsters will respawn. Some floors have pits in which the character falls down one level and has to fight monsters on that level again. The hero may also step on an alarm and may become trapped by monsters. Sometimes the hero respawns in a room with no visible doors, so he might need to search for a hidden door.

Food is a vital part of the game. When fed, the hero slowly regenerates health. If unfed for extended periods of time, the hero becomes hungry and loses health. Conversely, if too much food is eaten, the character dies of overeating. Some items can help or hinder the digestion of the hero.

Like many role-playing games, gold is present, though the only purpose it serves is to provide the player character with a better funeral service upon death. The more gold collected in the game, the more detailed the hero's grave. More people will attend the hero's funeral based on their level when killed.

References

External links

Fatal Labyrinth: The Most Cynical RPG! at I-Mockery
Fatal Labyrinth review at segadoes.com
Fatal Labyrinth debug page at tcrf.net

1990 video games
PlayStation Network games
Roguelike video games
Sega video games
Sega Genesis games
Sega Meganet games
Virtual Console games
Video games using procedural generation
Video games developed in Japan